The members of the 31st Manitoba Legislature were elected in the Manitoba general election held in October 1977. The legislature sat from November 24, 1977, to October 13, 1981.

The Progressive Conservative Party led by Sterling Lyon formed the government.

Edward Schreyer of the New Democratic Party was Leader of the Opposition. Howard Pawley became opposition leader in 1979 after Schreyer was named Governor General.

Harry Graham served as speaker for the assembly.

There were five sessions of the 31st Legislature:

Francis Lawrence Jobin was Lieutenant Governor of Manitoba.

Members of the Assembly 
The following members were elected to the assembly in 1977:

Notes:

By-elections 
By-elections were held to replace members for various reasons:

Notes:

References 

Terms of the Manitoba Legislature
1977 establishments in Manitoba
1981 disestablishments in Manitoba